Phu Thanh may refer to several commune-level subdivisions in Vietnam, including:

Phú Thành
 Phú Thành, Hòa Bình, a commune of Lạc Thủy District
 Phú Thành, An Giang, a commune of Phú Tân District, An Giang Province
 Phú Thành, Vĩnh Long, a commune of Trà Ôn District
 Phú Thành, Nghệ An, a commune of Yên Thành District

Phú Thanh
Phú Thanh, Đồng Nai, a commune of Tân Phú District, Đồng Nai
Phú Thanh, Thanh Hóa, a commune of Quan Hóa District
Phú Thanh, Thừa Thiên-Huế, a commune of Phú Vang District

Phú Thạnh
Phú Thạnh, Tân Phú, a ward of Tân Phú District, Ho Chi Minh City
Phú Thạnh, Phú Yên, a ward of Tuy Hòa
Phú Thạnh, An Giang, a commune of Phú Tân District, An Giang Province
Phú Thạnh, Đồng Nai, a commune of Nhơn Trạch District
Phú Thạnh, Tiền Giang, a commune of Tân Phú Đông District

See also
The communes of Phú Thành A and Phú Thành B in Tam Nông District, Đồng Tháp Province